Kenneth, Kenny, or Ken MacDonald (or McDonald) or Ken Macdonald may refer to:

Arts 
 Kenneth MacDonald (English actor) (1950–2001), "Mike" in "Only Fools And Horses" and "It Ain't Half Hot Mum"
 Kenneth MacDonald (American actor) (1901–1972), American film and TV actor
 Kenneth MacDonald (dancer) (1948–1995), dancer, Associate Artistic Director of the Des Moines Ballet

Government 
 Kenneth C. MacDonald (1872–1945), Canadian politician
 Ken Macdonald (born 1953), Baron Macdonald of River Glaven, QC, former Director of Public Prosecutions of England & Wales; Warden of Wadham College, Oxford
 Ken McDonald (politician) (born 1959), Liberal Member of Parliament, Newfoundland and Labrador
 Sir Kenneth Macdonald (civil servant), British civil servant and businessman

Sports 
 Kenny MacDonald (shinty player) (born 1965), shinty goalkeeper for Kyles Athletic
 Kenny MacDonald (footballer) (born 1961), Scottish footballer
 Ken MacDonald (cricketer) (1934–1999), Australian cricketer
 Ken MacDonald (footballer) (1898–?), Welsh footballer
 Ken McDonald (basketball) (born 1970), former basketball coach at Western Kentucky University
 Ken McDonald (soccer) (born 1955), American soccer player 
Ken McDonald (footballer) (born 1945), Scottish footballer
Ken McDonald (weightlifter), Australian and English weightlifter
Kenneth R. MacDonald, Canadian judge and curler

Others 
 Kenneth C. Macdonald (born 1947), American oceanographer
 Ken W. MacDonald (born 1959), Scottish businessman
 Kenneth A. MacDonald Jr., American architect in San Francisco
 Kenny MacDonald (Survival of the Dead), fictional character
 Kenneth McDonald, Louisville architect, see McDonald Brothers